Quintanilla is a Spanish surname. Notable people with the surname include:

 Abraham Quintanilla, Jr. (born 1939), American singer-songwriter and record producer, father of Selena Quintanilla-Pérez
 A.B. Quintanilla (Abraham Quintanilla III) (born 1963), American singer-songwriter and record producer, brother of Selena Quintanilla-Pérez
 Alba Quintanilla, Venezuelan composer, harpist, harpsichordist, pianist, conductor, and pedagogue
 Antonio de Quintanilla (1787–1863), Spanish brigadier and Governor of Chiloé
 Armando Quintanilla (born 1968), Mexican long-distance runner 
 Beto Quintanilla (1948–2007), Mexican singer, songwriter and musician
 Carl Quintanilla (born 1970) is an American journalist and CNBC anchor
 Carlos Quintanilla (1888–1964), President of Bolivia
 Diego Quintanilla (born 1991), Ecuadorian footballer
 Eleuterio Quintanilla (1886–1966), Spanish anarchist and educator
 Eliseo Quintanilla (born 1983), Salvadoran footballer
 Enrique Perea Quintanilla (1956–2006), Mexican journalist, crime reporter, and magazine founder
 Fernando Quintanilla (born 1964), Spanish footballer also known as Txirri
 Francisco Javier Quintanilla (born 1833), Chilean priest
 Hector Quintanilla (1923–1998), United States Air Force Lieutenant Colonel
 Isabel Quintanilla (1938–2017), Spanish visual artist
 José Quintanilla (footballer) (1947–1977), Salvadoran footballer
 José Alberto Quintanilla (born 1997), Bolivian swimmer
 María José Quintanilla (born 1990), Chilean singer, songwriter, and actress
 Mauricio Quintanilla (disambiguation), multiple people, including:
Mauricio Quintanilla (footballer, born 1952) (born 1952), Salvadoran football forward
Mauricio Quintanilla (footballer, born 1981) (born 1981), Salvadoran football defender
 Omar Quintanilla (born 1981), American baseball player
 Rolando Quintanilla (born 1977), Mexican racing driver 
 Selena Quintanilla-Pérez (1971–1995), American singer, songwriter, spokesperson, actress, and fashion designer

Spanish-language surnames